Adl is an Arabic word meaning justice.

Adl or ADL may also refer to:

Computing
 Action description language, a formal language for automatic planning systems
 Adventure Development Language, created by On-Line Systems
 Alder Lake series Intel CPUs
 Archetype definition language, as used in openEHR archetypes
 Architecture description language, a formal language for architecture description and representation
 Argument-dependent name lookup, a lookup for function names in the C++ programming language
 Assertion definition language, a specification language

Organizations
 ADL astronomical society, Slovenian astronomical society
 Akademiska Damkören Lyran or The Academic Female Voice Choir Lyran, a Finnish choir
 Alexander Dennis Limited, bus manufacturer in Scotland 
 Animal Defense League, animal rights organisation in North America 
 Anti-Defamation League, a Jewish non-governmental organization based in the US
 Armenian Democratic Liberal Party, a political party
 Arthur D. Little, a management consulting firm

Places
 Adelaide Airport, Australia, IATA airport code ADL
 A demonym for the city of Adelaide, South Australia, where the above airport is located
 Adlington (Lancashire) railway station, England, National Rail code ADL

Other uses
 Activities of daily living, a term used in medicine and nursing, especially in the care of the elderly
 Advance–decline line, a stock market indicator 
 Advanced Distributed Learning, part of an effort to standardize and modernize training and education management and delivery
 Arena Developmental League, American football league that became the National Arena League
 Gallong language, a Tibeto-Burman language of India
 New Zealand ADL class diesel electric unit, a type of diesel railway vehicle used on Auckland's suburban network
 A driver's license issued by a jurisdiction whose name begins with the letter A

People 
 Aurelio De Laurentiis, filmmaker and president of S.S.C. Napoli

See also
 ADLS (disambiguation)
 ALD (disambiguation)